Creating Masculinity in Los Angeles's Little Manila: Working-Class Filipinos and Popular Culture, 1920s-1950s is a 2006 non-fiction book authored by Linda España-Maram. It was published by Columbia University Press.

References

2006 non-fiction books
American non-fiction books
Asian-American culture in Los Angeles
Columbia University Press books
English-language books
Filipino-American culture in California
Masculinity
Men's studies literature
Working-class culture in California
Working-class literature
Masculist books